Alexeyevka is a rural locality (a selo) and the administrative center of Alexeyevskoye Rural Settlement, Korochansky District, Belgorod Oblast, Russia. The population was 2,259 as of 2010. There are 13 streets.

Geography 
Alexeyevka is located 13 km southwest of Korocha (the district's administrative centre) by road. Mazikino is the nearest rural locality.

References 

Rural localities in Korochansky District